As Classical Latin developed into Proto-Romance it gained and lost lexical items for a variety of reasons. Sometimes the new vocabulary came from contact with neighbouring languages, and other times it was coined from native elements. Much of the inherited Latin vocabulary also underwent semantic drift, regularization, or other linguistic changes.

Overview 
Irregular nouns and verbs tended to be either regularized or replaced with preexisting regular equivalents; cf. the loss of esse 'to eat' in favour of its own regularized compound comedere. Similar motives underlie the general replacement of ferre 'carry' with portare or loqui 'speak' with parabolare and fabulare.

Semantic drift affected numerous words, notable examples of which are causa ('subject matter' → 'thing'), civitas ('citizenry' → 'city'), focus ('hearth' → 'fire'), mittere ('send' → 'put'), necare ('murder' → 'drown'), pacare ('placate' → 'pay'), and totus ('whole' → 'all, every').

Words that were felt to be too short or phonetically insubstantial were more likely to be replaced, often with their own derivatives, hence auris 'ear' and agnus 'lamb' were rejected in favour of the diminutives auricula and agnellus.

A number of verb-forming (or extending) suffixes were popularized, such as -icare (based on the adjective ending -icus), -ulare (based on the diminutive -ul-), and -izare (borrowed from Greek).

The majority of borrowed vocabulary came from Greek, particularly in the domains of medicine, cooking, and Christian worship. A lesser fraction came from Gaulish or Germanic.

There was a trend towards forming compound prepositions of the type ab-ante, which at first simply combined the sense of their constitutuents (hence the original sense of abante was 'from before'). In time many would develop a generic sense, often simply that of one of their constituents (hence abante came to mean 'before', in competition with ante). Other examples attested in Late Antiquity are de-inter, de-retro, de-foris, de-intus, de-ab, and de-ex.

Most Classical particles (such as an, at, autem, donec, enim, etc.) simply died out in popular speech and hence survive nowhere in Romance.

Selected lexical comparisons
{| class="wikitable" style="margin-left: auto; margin-right: auto; border: none;"
|+
!Meaning
| rowspan="61" |
!Classical word
!Inherited descendants
| rowspan="61" |
!Competitor(s) in Proto-Romance
!Inherited descendants
!Origin
|-
|all
|omnis
|It. ogni
|totus
|Fr. tout, Oc. tot, Cat. tot, Sp. todo, Pt. todo, Srd. totu, It. tutto, Ro. tot
|Meant 'entire' in CL.
|-
| rowspan="3" |before
| rowspan="3" |ante
| rowspan="3" |OIt. anti, Sp. ante
|avante
|Fr. avant, Occ. avan, Cat. abans, Pt. avante, Sp. avante, It. avanti
|Ab 'away from' + ante.
|-
|inante
|OPt. enante, OSp. enante, Vgl. aninč, OIt. inanti, Nea. 'nnante, Ro. înainte, ARo. nãnte
|In + ante.
|-
|antes
|Sp. antes, Pt. antes
|Ante + ex 'out from'.
|-
|begin
|incipere
|Rms. entscheiver, Ro. începe(re)
|comintiare
|Fr. commencer, Occ. començar, Cat. començar, Sp. comenzar, Pt. começar, It. cominciare
|Prefixed and syncopated version of LL initiare 'start', a verb based on CL initium 'beginning'.
|-
| rowspan="2" |bird
| rowspan="2" |avis
| rowspan="2" |Cat. au, Sp. ave, Pt. ave, Srd. ae
|aucellus
|Fr. oiseau, Occ. aucèl, Cat. ocell, It. uccello
|Diminutive of avis.
|-
|passarus
|Sp. pájaro, Pt. pássaro, Ro. pasăre, It. "passero|Alteration of CL passer 'sparrow'.
|-
|cat
|felis|—
|cattus|Fr. chat, Occ. cat, Cat. gat, Sp. gato, Pt. gato, It. gatto|Late borrowing of obscure origin.
|-
|ear
|auris|—
|auricla~oricla|Fr. oreille, Occ. aurelha, Cat. orella, Sp. oreja, Pt. orelha, It. orecchio, Ro. ureche|Diminutive of auris.
|-
| rowspan="2" |eat
| rowspan="2" |esse| rowspan="2" |—
|comedere|Sp. comer, Pt. comer|Prefixed and regularized version of esse.
|-
|manducare|Fr. manger, Occ. manjar, Cat. menjar, Ara. minchar, OIt. manicare, It. mangiare, Ro. mâncare|Meant 'chew' in CL.
|-
|evening
|vesper|Fr. vêpre, Occ. vèspre, Cat. vespre, Pie. vespr, Lmb. vèsper, Vgl. viaspro|sera|Fr. soir, Rms. saira, Vgl. saira, It. sera, Ro. seară|Likely a shortening of an expression such as sera dies 'late (part of the) day'.
|-
|fire
|ignis|—
|focus|Fr. feu, Occ. fuòc, Cat. foc, Sp. fuego, Pt. fogo, It. fuoco, Ro. foc|Meant 'hearth' in CL.
|-
| rowspan="2" |fight
| rowspan="2" |pugna| rowspan="2" |—
|lucta|Fr. lutte, Occ. lucha, Cat. lluita, Sp. lucha, Pt. luta, It. lotta, Ro. luptă|Noun based on CL luctari 'wrestle, struggle'.
|-
|battalia|Fr. bataille, Occ. batalha, Cat. batalla, Pt. batalha, It. battaglia, Ro. bătaie|Alteration of earlier battualia, from CL battuere 'strike', an early borrowing from Gaulish.
|-
|from
|a~ab|Occ. amb, Cat. amb|de|Fr. de, Oc. de, Cat. de, Sp. de, Pt. de, It. di, Ro. de|Meant 'down from' in CL.
|-
|help
|iuvare|Frl. zovâ, It. giovare|adiutare|Fr. aider, Occ. ajudar, Cat. ajudar, Sp. ayudar, Pt. ajudar, It. aiutare, Ro. ajutare|Frequentative of CL adiuvare, a prefixed version of iuvare.
|-
|home
|domus|It. duomo, Srd. domu|casa|OFr. chiese, Occ. casa, Cat. casa, Sp. casa, Pt. casa, It. casa, Ro. casă|Meant 'hut' in CL.
|-
|inside
|intus|OFr. enz, Lig. inte|deintus|Fr. dans, Occ. dins, Cat. dins, It. dentro, Nea. dinto, Pt. dentro|De + intus, originally 'from within'. Attested in Late Latin.
|-
|kitchen
|culina|—
|cocina|Fr. cuisine, Occ. cosina, Cat. cuina, Sp. cocina, Pt. cozinha, It. cucina|Noun based on CL coquere 'cook'.
|-
|know
|scire|Ro. știre, Srd. ischire|sapere|Fr. savoir, Occ. saber, Cat. saber, Sp. saber, Pt. saber, It. sapere|Meant 'taste' in CL, but with the secondary senses of 'understand' and 'be intelligent'.
|-
|lamb
|agnus|Pt. anho|agnellus|Fr. agneau, Occ. anhèl, Cat. anyell, Rms. agnè, It. agnello, Sic. agneddu, Ro. miel|Originally simply the diminutive of agnus.
|-
|leg
|crus|—
|camba~gamba|Fr. jambe, Occ. camba, Cat. cama, OSp. cama, It. gamba, Ro. gambă|Late borrowing of Greek καμπή.
|-
|man
|vir|—
|homo|Fr. homme, Occ. òme, Cat. home, Sp. hombre, Pt. homem, It. uomo, Ro. om|Meant 'human being' in CL.
|-
|money
|pecunia|ARo. picunj~piculj|denarii|Fr. deniers, Occ. dinèrs, Cat. diners, Sp. dineros, Pt. dinheiros, It. denari, Ro. dinari|Referred to a specific type of coin in CL, though was used as a metonym for 'money' in Cicero's letters.
|-
|mouth
|os|—
|bucca|Fr. bouche, Occ. boca, Cat. boca, Sp. boca, Pt. boca, It. bocca, Ro. bucă|Meant 'cheek' in CL. Attested in the sense of 'mouth' already in the writings of Petronius.
|-
|narrow
|angustus|Sp. angosto, It. angusto, Ro. îngust|strictus|Fr. étroit, Occ. estreit, Cat. estret, Sp. estrecho, Pt. estreito, It. stretto, Ro. strâmt|Meant 'tightened' in CL.
|-
| rowspan="3" |now
| rowspan="3" |nunc| rowspan="3" |—
|ora|Sp. ora, Pt. hora, It. ora|CL hora 'hour, time'.
|-
|adora|Fr. or, Occ. aüra, Cat. ara|Composed of CL ad + hora(m). Attested in the writings of Anthimus.
|-
|acora|Sp. ahora, Pt. agora|Composed of CL hac 'this' + hora.|-
|old
|vetus|OFr. viet, Sp. viedo, OPt. vedro, It. vieto|veclus|Fr. vieux, Occ. vièlh, Cat. vell, Sp. viejo, Pt. velho, It. vecchio, Ro. vechi|Alteration of CL vetulus, a diminutive of vetus.
|-
|right
|dexter|OFr. destre, OOcc. dèstre, Cat. destre, Sp. diestro, Pt. destro, It. destro|directus~drectus|Fr. droit, Occ. dreit, Cat. dret, Sp. derecho, Pt. direito, It. diritto, Ro. drept|Meant 'straight' or 'level' in CL.
|-
|rope
|funis|It. fune, Ro. funie|corda|Occ. còrda, Cat. corda, Sp. cuerda, Pt. corda, It. corda, Ro. coardă|Borrowing of Greek χορδή.
|-
| rowspan="3" |Saturday
| rowspan="3" |dies saturni| rowspan="3" |—
|dies sabbati|Occ. dissabte, Cat. dissabte|Lit. 'day of the Sabbath'.
|-
|sambati dies|Fr. samedi, Rms. sonda|The same but reversed and with a nasal infix.
|-
|sabbatu~sambatu|Sp. sábado, Pt. sábado, It. sabato, Ro. sâmbătă, Srd. sàpadau|Simply the word for 'Sabbath' on its own.
|-
|shirt
|tunica|Cat. tonga, Sp. tonga, It. tonaca|camisia|Fr. chemise, Occ. camisa, Cat. camisa, Sp. camisa, Pt. camisa, It. camicia, Ro. cămașă|Late borrowing from Gaulish.
|-
|short
|brevis|Fr. bref, Occ. brèu, Cat. breu, It. breve, Sp. breve, Pt. breve|curtus|Fr. court, Occ. cort, Sp. corto, OPt. corto, It. corto, Ro. scurt|Meant 'cut short, mutilated' in CL.
|-
|sick
|infirmus|OFr. enfer, OOcc. eferm, Sp. enfermo, Pt. enfermo, It. infermo|malabitus|Fr. malade, Occ. malaut, Cat. malalt, It. malato, Srd. malaidu|Contraction of LL male habitus 'in poor shape'.
|-
|skin
|cutis|
|pellis|Fr. peau, Occ. pèl, Cat. pell, Sp. piel, Pt. pele, It. pelle, Ro. piele|Meant 'animal hide' in CL.
|-
| rowspan="3" |speak
| rowspan="3" |loqui| rowspan="3" |—
|fabulare|OOcc. faular, Vgl. favlur, OIt. favolare, Sp. hablar, Pt. falar|Regularization of the rare CL fabulari 'chat', originally 'tell stories', a verb based on fabula.
|-
|fabellare|Frl. fevelâ, OIt. favellare, Srd. faeddare|Verb based on CL fabella, the diminutive of fabula.
|-
|parabolare|Fr. parler, Occ. parlar, Cat. parlar, It. parlare|Verb based on CL parabola 'parable', a borrowing of Greek παραβολή.
|-
|stone
|saxum|Pt. seixo, It. sasso|petra|Fr. pierre, Occ. pèira, Cat. pedra, Sp. piedra, Pt. pedra, It. pietra, Ro. piatră|Late borrowing of Greek πέτρα.
|-
| rowspan="2" |Sunday
| rowspan="2" |dies solis| rowspan="2" |—
|dies dominicus|Fr. dimanche, Occ. dimenge, Cat. diumenge, Sp. domingo, Srd. dominigu| rowspan="2" |Lit. 'day of the Lord'. Dies 'day' could be either masculine or feminine in Latin.
|-
|dies dominica|Vgl. domienca, It. domenica, Ro. duminică|-
|swift
|celer|
|rapidus|OFr. rade, OSp. raudo, OIt. ratto, Ro. repede|Meant 'hasty' in CL.
|-
|sword
|gladius|OFr. glai, OOcc. glazi, OIt. ghiado|spatha|Fr. épée, Occ. espasa, Cat. espasa, Sp. espada, Pt. espada, It. spada, Ro. spată|Borrowing of Greek σπάθη.
|-
|teach
|docere|OFr. duire|insignare|Fr. enseigner, Occ. ensenhar, Cat. ensenyar, Sp. enseñar, Pt. ensinar, It. insegnare|Prefixed version of CL signare 'note, indicate'.
|-
| rowspan="2" |thick
| rowspan="2" |densus| rowspan="2" |Ro. des, Vgl. dais|grossus|Fr. gros, Occ. gròs, Cat. gros, Sp. grueso, Pt. grosso, It. grosso, Ro. gros|Of obscure origin.
|-
|spissus|Fr. épais, Occ. espés, Cat. espès, Sp. espeso, Pt. espesso, It. spesso|Generally meant 'slow', 'difficult', etc. in CL.
|-
|think
|cogitare|OFr. cuidier, Occ. cuidar, Cat. cuidar, Sp. cuidar, Pt. cuidar, OIt. coitare, Ro. cugetare|pensare|Fr. penser, Occ. pensar, Cat. pensar, Sp. pensar, Pt. pensar, It. pensare, Ro. păsare|Generally meant 'weigh' in CL, along with the extended sense of 'consider'.
|-
| rowspan="2" |tomorrow
| rowspan="2" |cras| rowspan="2" |OSp. cras, OPt. cras, OIt. crai, Sic. crai, Srd. cras|mane|Ro. mâine|Meant 'in the morning' in CL.
|-
|de mane|Fr. demain, Occ. deman, Cat. demà, Rms. damaun, It. domani|LL expression meaning 'early in the morning'.
|-
|touch
|tangere|OCat. tànyer, Sp. tañer, Pt. tanger|toccare|Fr. toucher, Occ. tocar, Cat. tocar, Sp. tocar, Pt. tocar, It. toccare, Ro. tocare|Borrowed from Germanic, with the original sense of 'hit, strike'.
|-
|understand
|intellegere|Rms. encleger, Ro. înțelegere|intendere|Fr. entendre, Occ. entendre, Cat. entendre, Sp. entender, Pt. entender, It. intendere|Had various senses in CL, most relevantly 'direct one's attention (towards)'.
|-
|week
|hebdomas|OFr. domée, Ct. doma, Rms. jamna, Vgl. jedma, OIt. edima and domada.
|septimana|Fr. semaine, Occ. setmana, Cat. setmana, Sp. semana, Pt. semana,  Vgl. setimuon, It. settimana, Ro. săptămână|Attested in LL, from CL septem 'seven', referring to the number of days in a week.
|-
|wide
|latus|Fr. lé, Ro. lat|largus|Fr. large, Occ. larg, Cat. llarg, OSp. largo, Pt. largo, It. largo, Ro. larg|Meant 'abundant' in CL.
|-
|word
|verbum|Fr. verve, OSp. vierbo, Ast. vierbu, Ro. vorbă|parabola|Fr. parole, Occ. paraula, Cat. paraula, Sp. palabra, Pt. palavra, It. parola, Srd. paragula|Meant 'parable' in CL, a borrowing of Greek παραβολή.
|-
|work
|laborare|Occ. laurar, Cat. llaurar, Sp. labrar, Pt. lavrar, Rms. luvrar, It. lavorare|tripaliare|Fr. travailler, Occ. trabalhar, Cat. treballar, Sp. trabajar, Pt. trabalhar, Srd. triballare|Verb based on LL tripalium, a sort of torture device made of three stakes.
|}

 See also 
 Appendix Probi
 Reichenau Glossary
 Proto-Romance language
 Phonological changes from Classical Latin to Proto-Romance

 Explanatory notes 

 Citations 

 General sources 
 Dworkin, Steven Norman. 2016. Lexical stability and shared lexicon. In Ledgeway, Adam & Maiden, Martin (eds.), The Oxford guide to the Romance languages, 577–587. Oxford University Press.
Elcock, William Dennis. 1975. The Romance languages. London: Faber and Faber.
 Herman, József. 2000. Vulgar Latin. University Park: Pennsylvania State University Press. Translated by Wright, Roger.
 Lewis, Charlton; Short, Charles. 1879. A Latin Dictionary. Oxford: Clarendon Press.
 Löfstedt, Einar. 1959. Late Latin. Oslo: H. Aschehoug & Co. Translated by Willis, James.
 Meyer-Lübke, Wilhelm. 1911. Romanisches etymologisches Wörterbuch''. Heidelberg: C. Winter.

Latin language in ancient Rome
Vocabulary
Romance languages